Vonavona is an island in the Solomon Islands; it is located in the Western Province. Alternative local names and spellings of the island are Parara, Wanawana . The estimated terrain elevation above sea level is some 21 metres. Vonavona borders Ferguson Passage to the west, Arundel Island to the east, and Kolombangara Island to the north.

References

Islands of the Solomon Islands
Western Province (Solomon Islands)